Hindupur is a city in Sri Sathya Sai district of the Indian state of Andhra Pradesh.  It is located to the edge of the Andhra–Karnataka border and is the headquarters of Hindupur mandal. Hindupur is the biggest Parliamentary Constituency in the newly formed District Sri Sathya Sai. It is located about 67 km from district headquarters Puttaparthi, 100 km from Bengaluru the capital of Karnataka, 95 km From Kadiri.

, Hindupur municipality had a population of 151,835. It is an important local pilgrimage center with a number of temples in and around the city, including Sri Peta Venkata Ramana Swamy Temple, Sree Vasavi Kanyaka Parameshwari Temple, Guddam Sri Ranganath Swamy Temple, Sugur Sri Anjaneya Swamy Temple, and the historical Lepakshi Sri Veerabhadra Swamy Temple.

Hindupur is connected with the major cities in the region by road and by train. This includes National Highway 44, Bangalore Highway, Parigi Road, Lepakshi Road, Kadiri SH-61 Road (proposed to be a four lane highway in 2022), and Penukonda Road. Hindupur Railway Station (code – 'HUP') in the Bengaluru City Railway Station(KSR Bengaluru) stretch of the South Western Railway zone is one of the busiest in the route. The Penukonda–Hindupur and Hindupur Industrial Area maintained by Andhra Pradesh Industrial Infrastructure Corporation and Hindupur's surrounding stretch has a number of industries involved in manufacturing, pharmaceutical, automobile and IT which makes Hindupur as industrial town in State. Recently Union Finance Minister Nirmala Sitaraman laid foundation stone for construction of National Academy of Customs Indirect Taxes and Narcotics at Hindupur.

Etymology 
Legendary accounts say that Hindupur was founded by and named after Hindu Rao, the name that the father of Maratha General Murari Rao Ghorpade was known as.

Climate and rainfall 
Even in summers, the city experiences lower temperatures compared to the rest of the state due to its high elevation. Average annual rainfall is 551mm.

Geography 
It has an average elevation of 2,037 feet (621 metres).

Demographics 
 2011 Census of India, the city had a population of 151,677, an increase of about 25,000 compared to the previous census in 2001, when it was 125,074. The population recorded in the 2011 census was made up of 76,625 males and 75,210 females — a sex ratio of 982 females per 1000 males, which is higher than the national average of 940 per 1000. 16,309 children were in the age group of 0–6 years, of which 8,263 were boys and 8,046 were girls. The average literacy rate stood at 76.40% with 103,538 literates, significantly higher than the state average of 67.41%. Telugu is the official and spoken language. Kannada is the second most spoken language since it shares the Karnataka State Border.

Economy 
Clothes and retail (referred to locally as Mundy Merchants) are the most significant businesses, along with food producers and wholesalers. Hindupur has three privately run spinning mills and a food manufacturer called Kirikera Food Products Ltd.

Government and politics 
Hindupur municipality was formed in the year 1920.

Transport 
The Andhra Pradesh State Road Transport Corporation operates bus services from Hindupur bus station. Hindupur railway station is administered under the Bangalore division of the South Western Railway zone. It is located in the Guntakal–Bangalore section of Indian Railways. The nearest Airport is Bangalore International Airport, which is 90 Kms away and Puttaparthi Private Airport, which is 70 Kms away. Krishnapatnam Port is located around 350 km from the town.

Education
There are many government and privately administered schools across the city. The primary and secondary school education is imparted by government aided and private schools, under the School Education Department of the state. There are government aided institutions like Government Polytechnic Hindupur and other private and government degree colleges and one private engineering college (soon the college closing down). Despite being biggest town in District, the town does not have a government Intermediate College for Boys, Government Degree College for Boys, Government Diploma College for Boys, for Engineering Graduate courses one has to go to Ananapur. The town was so poor in education infrastructure.  Schools teach in several languages, including English, Telugu, Urdu and Kannada.

See also 
List of cities in Andhra Pradesh
List of cities in India by population

References

External links 

Cities and towns in Sri Sathya Sai district
Mandal headquarters in Sri Sathya Sai district
Cities in Andhra Pradesh